Mario Sergio may refer to:

Mário Sérgio (actor, born 1929), Brazilian actor
Mario Sergio (politician) (born 1940), Canadian politician
Mário Sérgio (footballer, born 1950) (1950–2016), Brazilian football manager and former midfielder
Mário Sérgio (footballer, born 1977), Brazilian football midfielder
Mário Sérgio (footballer, born 1981), Portuguese football right-back
Mário Sérgio (footballer, born 1992), Brazilian football defender
 (born 1983), Colombian footballer